Roque Simón Sevilla Larrea (born July 16, 1947, in Quito, Ecuador) is an Ecuadorian economist, businessman, environmentalist, and politician. He was the Metropolitan Mayor of Quito between 1998 and 2000. He is President of the "Grupo Futuro" that brings together various companies including tourism, insurance, and the environment.

Biography 
He studied at the Colegio Cardenal Spellman and then at the Colegio Alemán.

He studied economics at the Pontifical Catholic University of Ecuador, graduating as an economist in 1984.

He earned a Master's degree of Public Administration from Harvard University's John F. Kennedy School of Government.

In 1976, he founded the "Fundación Natura".

In 1991, he was appointed Director of the World Wide Fund for Nature (WWF) in the United States.

In 1997, he was appointed to the Board of the World Wide Fund for Nature International (WWF-I).

He was a councilor for the Metropolitan District of Quito in 1992.

He was a member of the National Congress of Ecuador in 1998, and Metropolitan Mayor of Quito between 1998 and 2000.

In 2012, he built and inaugurated the luxury eco hotel "Mashpi Lodge" deep inside the Chocó forest, a cloud forest in the Andes, 100 km northwest of Quito.

References

External links 
  

1947 births
Living people
People from Quito
20th-century Ecuadorian economists
21st-century Ecuadorian economists
20th-century Ecuadorian politicians
21st-century Ecuadorian politicians
Members of the National Congress (Ecuador)
Mayors of Quito
Christian Democratic Union (Ecuador) politicians
Ecuadorian businesspeople
Hoteliers
Ecuadorian environmentalists
Pontifical Catholic University of Ecuador alumni
Harvard Kennedy School alumni